HD 156768 is a double star in the southern constellation of Ara, with a combined apparent magnitude of 5.86. The brighter component is a sixth magnitude bright giant or supergiant star with a stellar classification of G8Ib/II. The magnitude 9.6 companion lies at an angular separation of 1.81″ along a position angle of 184°.

References

External links
 HR 6438
 CCDM J17229-5801
 Image HD 156768

Ara (constellation)
Double stars
G-type supergiants
Durchmusterung objects
156768
6438
085049